Mike Crocenzi (born 16 July 1969) is a Sammarinese bobsledder. He competed with Dino Crescentini in the two man event at the 1994 Winter Olympics.

See also
San Marino national bobsleigh team

References

External links
 

1969 births
Living people
Sammarinese male bobsledders
Olympic bobsledders of San Marino
Bobsledders at the 1994 Winter Olympics
Sportspeople from Warren, Michigan